Cloacibacillus is a Gram-negative and anaerobic genus of bacteria from the family of Synergistaceae. Cloacibacillus bacteria are pathogenic.

See also
 List of bacterial orders
 List of bacteria genera

References

Synergistota
Bacteria genera